Pye Hill and Somercotes railway station was a railway station on the Great Northern Railway (Great Britain) on its Derbyshire Extension on the branch between Kimberley and Pinxton. It served the villages of Pye Hill and Somercotes.

The station was opened by the Great Northern Railway on 24 March 1877, and was originally named Pye Hill; it was renamed Pye Hill and Somercotes on 8 January 1906, and closed on 7 January 1963. The station was immortalised in 1964 in the song "Slow Train" by Flanders and Swann.

Route

See also 
 List of closed railway stations in Britain

References

External links
Pye Hill and Somercotes Station on navigable 1947 O.S. map (right-hand station of the two shown)

Disused railway stations in Nottinghamshire
Former Great Northern Railway stations
Railway stations in Great Britain opened in 1877
Railway stations in Great Britain closed in 1963